Georg Jarno (3 June 1868, in Buda – 25 May 1920, in Breslau) was a Hungarian composer, mainly of operettas.

Biography
After he finished his studies in Budapest, he worked as Theaterkapellmeister in Bremen, Gera, Halle, Saxony-Anhalt, Metz, Liegnitz, Chemnitz and Magdeburg, and also as opera director in Bad Kissingen, before settling in Vienna as a freelance composer. Before 1903, Jarno's name was György Cohner. He is buried in the New Jewish Cemetery in Wrocław, Poland.

Career
Jarno's greatest successes were Die Försterchristl (1907) and Das Musikantenmädel (1910). His operettas Das Farmermädchen and Jungfer Sonnenschein were well received, whereas Die Marine-Gustl, Mein Annerl, Der Goldfisch and Die Csikosbaroness could muster only passing interest. Much of the success of his works was due to the distinguished presentation of their title roles by his brother's (Joseph Jarno) wife, the highly popular actress and soubrette Hansi Niese.

He loved to introduce historically well known persons into his operettas; Kaiser Joseph II in Die Försterchristl, Prince Eugene of Savoy in Jungfer Sonnenschein, Joseph Haydn in Das Musikantenmädel.

Before operettas, he wrote three operas: Die schwarze Kaschka (1895), Der Richter von Zalamea (1899) based on Calderon's El alcalde de Zalamea, and Der zerbrochne Krug (1903) based on Heinrich von Kleist's play; none prevailed.

His main success, Die Försterchristl, had a run of 64 performances at Broadway's Herald Square Theatre in 1910/11 under the title The Girl and the Kaiser.

Stage works

Bibliography

References

''Reclams Operettenführer, Anton Würz (ed.), Stuttgart 1962

External links
 

1868 births
1920 deaths
19th-century classical composers
20th-century classical composers
Hungarian classical composers
Hungarian expatriates in Austria
Hungarian expatriates in Germany
Hungarian opera composers
Hungarian male classical composers
Male opera composers
People from Buda
20th-century Hungarian male musicians
19th-century male musicians